Rear Admiral William Mayhew Folger (19 May 1844 – 22 July 1928) was an officer in the United States Navy. He served in the American Civil War without seeing action. He filled a wide range of roles, including Chief of the Bureau of Ordnance, over the following 30 years. He fought in the Spanish–American War as captain of the protected cruiser . Folger served as a lighthouse inspector before becoming commander of the Philippine Squadron during the Philippine–American War, and was briefly Commander-in-Chief of the United States Asiatic Fleet. He retired in 1905 as a rear admiral.

Naval career

Early career

Folger was born in Massillon, Ohio, on 19 May 1844, the son of Robert H. Folger, grandson of the famed whaling captain Mayhew Folger, and descendant of Peter Foulger and Mary Morrill Foulger. He was appointed a midshipman from Ohio on 21 September 1861, shortly after the April 1861 outbreak of the American Civil War. He entered the United States Naval Academy, which moved from Annapolis, Maryland, to Newport, Rhode Island, for the duration of the war, as a member of the class of 1865. He graduated early from the academy, on 22 November 1864, because of the pressing need for officers in the greatly expanded wartime U.S. Navy, and reported for duty on 6 February 1865 aboard the receiving ship  at the New York Navy Yard in Brooklyn, New York. He then served on the training ship , where he remained through the end of the war in April 1865 and until 25 July 1865.

USS Hartford and USS Franklin

Folger served aboard the flagship of the Asiatic Squadron, the sloop-of-war , from 25 July 1865 to 6 August 1868, and while aboard was commissioned as an ensign on 1 November 1866 and promoted to master on 1 December 1866 and to lieutenant on 12 March 1868. After leaving Hartford, he had duty at the Norfolk Navy Yard in Portsmouth, Virginia, for a time in 1868 before reporting aboard the screw frigate , the flagship of the European Squadron, in October 1868. He was promoted to lieutenant commander on 27 April 1869 while aboard Franklin. He served on the staff of the European Squadron during 1872.

Folger had ordnance duty from 1873 to 1874, then took leave to travel in Europe from 1875 to 1876. He reported for duty aboard the screw sloop-of-war  in the European Squadron in 1877, then transferred to the staff of the U.S. Naval Academy for duty from 1877 to 1879. He was aboard the screw sloop-of-war  in the Asiatic Squadron from 1879 to 1882, then served in the Bureau of Ordnance in 1882 before performing ordnance duty at Annapolis, Maryland, from 1882 to 1885. He was promoted to commander on 1 March 1885.

Commodore and captain

Folger returned to sea as the commanding officer of the screw corvette  in the European Squadron. He then was Inspector of Ordnance at the Washington Navy Yard in Washington, D.C., from 1888 to 1890, and from February 1890 to January 1893 was Chief of the Bureau of Ordnance with the temporary rank of commodore. He commanded the gunboat  in operations in the Bering Sea and in the Asiatic Squadron from 1894 to 1895. He was a lighthouse inspector from 1896 to 1897, and was promoted to captain on 6 February 1898.

Spanish–American War

At the outbreak of the Spanish–American War in April 1898, Folger took command of the protected cruiser  in the North Atlantic Squadron, leading her through the end of war in August 1898, seeing service in the Flying Squadron off Cuba and in bombardments of Santiago de Cuba on 6 and 16 June 1898. He detached from New Orleans in February 1899, and then was commander of the Philippine Squadron of the Asiatic Squadron from April to September 1899, during which time the squadron saw action in the Philippine–American War. He next was general inspector on the new battleship , still fitting out prior to commissioning, and became her first commanding officer when she was commissioned on 20 February 1900. He detached from Kearsarge in May 1901 and again became a lighthouse inspector, carrying out this duty in the Third District until late 1903 or early in 1904.

Folger became commander of the Philippine Squadron of the United States Asiatic Fleet in early 1904 and was soon promoted to rear admiral, on 1 June 1904. Later in 1904, he took command of the fleet's Cruiser Squadron. He served briefly as commander-in-Chief of the Asiatic Fleet from 23 March 1905 to 30 March 1905.

Folger retired from the Navy on 30 June 1905.

Personal life
Folger was an Original Companion of the Military Order of the Loyal Legion of the United States. In 1898 he became a Veteran Companion of the Pennsylvania Commandery of the Military Order of Foreign Wars.

Folger House, his home of many years in Cornish, New Hampshire, is on the National Register of Historic Places in the United States.

Death
Folger died in Cornish on the evening of Sunday, 22 July 1928, after an illness of three weeks. He is buried at Mount Auburn Cemetery in Cambridge and Watertown, Massachusetts.

Military offices

See also

Footnotes

Notes

References

External links
 Photograph of Folger House, the home of William Mayhew Folger

1844 births
1928 deaths
United States Navy rear admirals (upper half)
United States Naval Academy alumni
United States Naval Academy faculty
Union Navy officers
American military personnel of the Spanish–American War
American military personnel of the Philippine–American War
People of Ohio in the American Civil War
People from Massillon, Ohio
Burials at Mount Auburn Cemetery